Cymbionotum is a genus of ground beetles in the family Carabidae. There are at least 20 described species in Cymbionotum.

Species
These 20 species belong to the genus Cymbionotum:

 Cymbionotum basale (Dejean, 1831)  (Africa)
 Cymbionotum candidum Andrewes, 1935  (Pakistan)
 Cymbionotum capicola (Péringuey, 1908)  (Africa)
 Cymbionotum fasciatum (Dejean, 1831)  (Africa)
 Cymbionotum fasciger (Chaudoir, 1852)  (India)
 Cymbionotum fernandezi Ball & Shpeley, 2005  (Colombia)
 Cymbionotum fluviale Andrewes, 1935  (India and Sri Lanka)
 Cymbionotum helferi (Chaudoir, 1850)  (Southeast Asia)
 Cymbionotum mandli (Jedlicka, 1963)  (Iran)
 Cymbionotum microphthalmum (Chaudoir, 1876)  (Africa, Southwest Asia)
 Cymbionotum namwala Ball & Shpeley, 2005  (Zambia)
 Cymbionotum negrei Perrault, 1994  (Venezuela)
 Cymbionotum pictulum (Bates, 1874)  (Southwest Asia)
 Cymbionotum rufotestaceum (Fairmaire, 1893)  (Ethiopia)
 Cymbionotum schueppelii (Dejean, 1825)  (Africa, Middle East)
 Cymbionotum semelederi (Chaudoir, 1861)  (Africa, Asia, Europe)
 Cymbionotum semirubricum (Reitter, 1914)  (Africa, Southwest Asia)
 Cymbionotum striatum (Reitter, 1894)  (Afghanistan and Pakistan)
 Cymbionotum subcaecum Ball & Shpeley, 2005  (Pakistan)
 Cymbionotum transcaspicum (Semenov, 1891)  (Asia, Middle East, Africa)

References

Carabidae